Vadambacheri is a village' in Coimbatore district, Kamanaicken Palayam in India. In the 2011 census it had a population of 8252 in 2391 households.

Predominant people of this Village are Hand Loom weavers and Sarees manufactured by them were exported all over the World . The Vaadambacheri Gram Panchayat is located in the Kamanaicken Palayam area of Coimbatore district, Tamil Nadu.  This panchayat belongs to the Sulur Assembly constituency and the Coimbatore Lok Sabha constituency.  The panchayat has a total of 7 panchayats.  From these, 7 council members are elected.  Sri Ramalinga Sowdeswari Amman, Nelukkuppa Amman , Sri Muniappa swamy Temples are the most famous temples in this Village.

Sri Natarajar Handloom Weavers Society and Sri Ramalinga Sowdeswari Handloom Weavers Society are the well known for Handloom Sarees.

Sri Chokkan Chettiar Mallamal Higher Secondary School is one of the renowned School of this Village.

Panchayat villages 
 Periya vadambachery 
 Chinna vadambachery
 Shakthi nagar
 Kamanaicken Palayam south
 v.mettur
 v.vaduga palayam
 Gandhi nagar
 Nalli gounden palayam
 S.R.C.Colony
 Odakkal palayam
 Sowdeswari nagar
 Gownden Palayam
 M.G.R Nagar
 Nallur palayam

References

Villages in Coimbatore district